The Samsung Galaxy Spica, also known as Samsung Spica, Samsung GT-I5700, Samsung Galaxy Lite and Samsung Galaxy Portal, is a smartphone manufactured by Samsung that uses the open source Android operating system. The phone is positioned below the Samsung Galaxy (original). Even though some of its features like the camera resolution, storage and data connection speeds are lower than the i7500 its processor's clock speed is much higher at 800 MHz. It is succeeded by the Samsung Galaxy 3.

Features 
The Galaxy Spica is 3G smartphone, offering quad-band GSM and announced with two-band HSDPA (900/2100) at 3.6Mbit/s. The phone features a 3.2-inch LCD capacitive touch screen, a 3.2 megapixel autofocus camera, and a digital compass. The i5700 has a standard 3.5mm headphone jack and is equipped with DNSe 2.0.

Software-wise, the Galaxy Spica offers a suite of Mobile Google services, including Google Search, Gmail, YouTube, Google Calendar, and Google Talk. The phone's GPS enables Google Maps features such as My Location, Google Latitude, and Street View. It also supports MP3, AAC (including iTunes Plus downloads), WMA audio, and H.264 video. The phone is also capable of playing DivX and Xvid coded content which makes it the first Android phone that supports this feature.

Availability 
The phone was available in Europe, Asia and Middle East. The i5700 is Samsung's second Android-based handset for Europe. The phone was released in December 2009 in Turkey and is released in Canada on the Rogers Communications network.

Software 

The Samsung Galaxy Spica has received an update to Android 2.1 Eclair as of February 2010. Some phone vendors, such as Three and T-Mobile in the UK, have started shipping the phone with 2.1 Eclair preloaded.
As of May 2010, phones have started to sell in India and Indonesia with the 2.1 Eclair update preloaded.

The only official method for updating the Spica is via Samsung's PC Studio software and not, unlike others, via OTA.

It is not possible to update Branded phones in this way. In this case, the phones needs to be updated by an official Samsung Partner.

However, unsupported methods are available using a combination of third-party software and a range of available firmware from Android 1.5 Cupcake to alpha versions of Android 2.2 Froyo, Android 2.3 Gingerbread and Android 4.0 Ice Cream Sandwich.

See also 
 List of Android devices

References 

Android (operating system) devices
Galaxy Spica
Galaxy Spica
Samsung smartphones
Mobile phones introduced in 2009